Charles Melton Luskey (April 6, 1876 – December 20, 1962) was an outfielder in Major League Baseball. He played for the Washington Senators in 1901.

References

External links

1876 births
1962 deaths
Major League Baseball outfielders
Washington Senators (1901–1960) players
Baseball players from Washington, D.C.
Portsmouth Browns players
Asheville Moonshiners players
Bradford Pirates players
Portsmouth Boers players
Waterbury Rough Riders players
Buffalo Bisons (minor league) players
Atlanta Crackers players
Syracuse Stars (minor league baseball) players
Scranton Miners players
Marion Moguls players
Marion Diggers players
Erie Sailors players
Youngstown Indians players
Charleston Sea Gulls players
Newport News Shipbuilders players
Richmond Colts players